Jackson Township is a township in Northumberland County, Pennsylvania, United States. The population at the 2010 Census was 875, a decline from the figure of 928 tabulated in 2000.

Geography

Demographics

As of the census of 2000, there were 928 people, 348 households, and 261 families residing in the township.  The population density was 72.8 people per square mile (28.1/km2).  There were 373 housing units at an average density of 29.3/sq mi (11.3/km2).  The racial makeup of the township was 98.38% White, 0.11% African American, 0.11% Native American, 0.54% Asian, 0.11% from other races, and 0.75% from two or more races. Hispanic or Latino of any race were 0.54% of the population.

There were 348 households, out of which 32.8% had children under the age of 18 living with them, 67.5% were married couples living together, 4.6% had a female householder with no husband present, and 25.0% were non-families. 22.7% of all households were made up of individuals, and 13.5% had someone living alone who was 65 years of age or older.  The average household size was 2.58 and the average family size was 3.06.

In the township the population was spread out, with 26.6% under the age of 18, 5.2% from 18 to 24, 28.2% from 25 to 44, 24.8% from 45 to 64, and 15.2% who were 65 years of age or older.  The median age was 39 years. For every 100 females, there were 100.4 males.  For every 100 females age 18 and over, there were 96.3 males.

The median income for a household in the township was $36,528, and the median income for a family was $44,091. Males had a median income of $32,014 versus $21,944 for females. The per capita income for the township was $16,039.  About 8.3% of families and 15.4% of the population were below the poverty line, including 16.8% of those under age 18 and 8.2% of those age 65 or over.

References

Populated places established in 1775
Townships in Northumberland County, Pennsylvania
Townships in Pennsylvania